Ludwig von Sybel (1 July 1846 – 5 April 1929) was a German archaeologist.

Life

Sybel was born at Marburg, Hesse, as the son  of Heinrich von Sybel. He studied at Göttingen and Bonn  and became an associate professor of archaeology at the University of Marburg in 1877. In 1888 he attained a full professorship at Marburg, where in 1906, he was named rector.

His scientific travels included trips to Italy (1871-72), Paris and Greece (1879-80) and England (1886).

Selected works
 Ueber Schliemanns Troja (1875)
 Die Mythologie der Ilias (1877)
 Katalog der Skulpturen zu Athen (1881)
 Kritik des ägyptischen Ornaments (1883)
 Weltgeschichte der Kunst im Altertum (second edition, 1903)
 Christliche Antike (I. Einleitendes, Katakomben, 1906; II. Skulptur, Architectur, 1909)

References
 

1846 births
1929 deaths
Archaeologists from Hesse
People from Marburg
People from the Electorate of Hesse
University of Göttingen alumni
University of Bonn alumni
Academic staff of the University of Marburg